The 1968–69 Illinois Fighting Illini men's basketball team represented the University of Illinois.

Regular season

In only his second season as the Head coach of the Fighting Illini, Harv Schmidt guided his basketball team to a high-point of an Associated Press ranking of number 4 by the beginning of January, 1969. Schmidt and his Illini won their first ten games of the season with the single biggest win occurring December 21, 1968, as they stopped the Houston Cougars' 60 game home winning streak, 97–84. After the win, the Illini, just two days short of two years after the original "Slush Fund" announcement, appeared to be back in their prime. During the season the Illini defeated a total of 4 top 20 teams, including a tenth ranked Ohio State in February.  Like so many years before, the Illini's only losses came at the hands of the competition provided by the other teams within the Big Ten Conference.  The team completed the season with only 5 losses, all coming within the league. The final totals were 19 wins overall with 9 of those wins coming within the conference.  The team was led in scoring for the season by Dave Scholz, Greg Jackson, Mike Price and Jodie Harrison.  Scholz would finish his senior season by being named 1st team All-American by the Helms Foundation, 3rd team All-American by the Associated Press and to the Converse honorable mention All-American team. The Fighting Illini would go on to finish the season with a 19-5 overall record and tied for 2nd place in the conference with a 9–5 record.

The 1968-69 team's starting lineup included Scholz and Fred Miller at the forward spots, Price and Harrison as guards and Jackson at center.

Roster

Source

Schedule
												
Source																
												

|-												
!colspan=12 style="background:#DF4E38; color:white;"| Non-Conference regular season

	

|-
!colspan=9 style="background:#DF4E38; color:#FFFFFF;"|Big Ten regular season

|-

Player stats

Awards and honors
Dave Scholz
Team Most Valuable Player 
1st team All-American (Helms)
3rd team All-American (AP)
Honorable Mention All-American (Converse)

Team players drafted into the NBA

*Kuberski transferred to Bradley to finish his eligibility due to the "Slush-Fund" scandal of 1966.
*Jones transferred to Memphis State to finish his eligibility due to the "Slush-Fund" scandal of 1966.

Rankings

References

Illinois Fighting Illini
Illinois Fighting Illini men's basketball seasons
1968 in sports in Illinois
1969 in sports in Illinois